Compositions is the fourth album by American R&B/soul singer Anita Baker. The album peaked at #5 on the US Billboard 200 and was certified platinum in 1990, making it Baker's third platinum selling album. The album also won the Grammy Award for Best Female R&B Vocal Performance at the 1991 Grammy Awards. Compositions would be the last album and collaboration between Baker and producer Michael J. Powell.

Track listing
 "Talk to Me" (Baker, Vernon Fails, Michael Powell) - 5:03
 "Perfect Love Affair" (Baker, Joel Davis) - 5:19
 "Whatever It Takes" (Baker, Marc Gordon, Gerald LeVert) - 5:35
 "Soul Inspiration" (Terry Britten, Graham Lyle) - 5:17
 "Lonely" (Baker) - 4:29
 "No One to Blame" (Baker, Fails) - 4:41
 "More Than You Know" (Baker, Vernon Fails, Michael Powell) - 4:48
 "Love You to The Letter" (James McBride) - 7:20
 "Fairy Tales" (Baker, Fails, Powell) - 7:55

Personnel 
 Anita Baker – lead and backing vocals
 Vernon Fails – keyboards
 Greg Phillinganes – acoustic piano, backing vocals (7)
 Ben Keys – programming
 David Ward – programming
 Michael J. Powell – guitar (1-4, 6, 7, 9), backing vocals (7)
 Earl Klugh – guitar (7)
 Nathan East – bass, backing vocals (7)
 Ricky Lawson – drums (1, 4, 5, 7)
 Steve Ferrone – drums (2, 3, 6, 8, 9)
 Paulinho da Costa – percussion (1, 2, 4-9)
 Perri (Carol, Darlene, Lori and Sharon Perry)  – backing vocals (2, 4, 7), BGV arrangement (4)

Production
 Producer – Michael J. Powell
 Executive Producer – Anita Baker
 Engineer – Barney Perkins
 Second Engineers – Tom Beiner, Steve Gallagher and Bart Stevens.
 Assistant Engineer – Milton Chan
 Additional Engineers – Darroll Gustamachio, Elliott Peters and Gerard Smerek.
 Mixing – Barney Perkins (Tracks 1, 3 & 5-9); Gerard Smerek (Tracks 2 & 4).
 Mastered by Bernie Grundman at Bernie Grundman Mastering (Hollywood, CA).
 Art Direction – Anita Baker and Carol Bobolts
 Photography – Adrian Buckmaster 
 Management – Randy Bash, Sherwin Bash and Ricki Sellner for BNB Associates, Ltd.

Awards
Grammy Awards

Charts

Weekly charts

Year-end charts

Certifications

References

1990 albums
Anita Baker albums
Elektra Records albums
Albums produced by Michael J. Powell